Jeffrey Heijm is a Dutch mixed martial artist.

Mixed martial arts record

|-
| Loss
| align=center| 3-4-2
| Metin Yakut
| Decision (1-0 points)
| KD 2: Killer Dome 2
| 
| align=center| 2
| align=center| 3:00
| Amsterdam, Netherlands
| 
|-
| Loss
| align=center| 3-3-2
| Furdjel de Windt
| Decision (1-0 points)
| KD 1: Killer Dome 1
| 
| align=center| 0
| align=center| 0:00
| Amsterdam, Netherlands
| 
|-
| Loss
| align=center| 3-2-2
| Stephan Tapilatu
| Decision (unanimous)
| Rings Holland: Di Capo Di Tutti Capi
| 
| align=center| 2
| align=center| 5:00
| Utrecht, Netherlands
| 
|-
| Loss
| align=center| 3-1-2
| Brian Lo-A-Njoe
| Decision (unanimous)
| Rings Holland: There Can Only Be One Champion
| 
| align=center| 2
| align=center| 5:00
| Utrecht, Netherlands
| 
|-
| Win
| align=center| 3-0-2
| Rogier van Eck
| Submission (armbar)
| Rings Holland: The Kings of the Magic Ring
| 
| align=center| 2
| align=center| 2:57
| Utrecht, Netherlands
| 
|-
| Win
| align=center| 2-0-2
| Biolcati Biolcati
| KO (knee)
| WD: Warriors Day
| 
| align=center| 0
| align=center| 0:00
| Pavia, Italy
| 
|-
| Draw
| align=center| 1-0-2
| Youssef Akhnikh
| Draw
| Rings Holland: Judgement Day
| 
| align=center| 3
| align=center| 3:00
| Amsterdam, North Holland, Netherlands
| 
|-
| Win
| align=center| 1-0-1
| Ron Post
| Decision
| Together Productions: Fight Gala
| 
| align=center| 0
| align=center| 0:00
| Huizen, Netherlands
| 
|-
| Draw
| align=center| 0-0-1
| Ron Post
| Draw
| BOA: Battle of Amstelveen
| 
| align=center| 2
| align=center| 5:00
| Amstelveen, North Holland, Netherlands
|

See also
List of male mixed martial artists

References

Dutch male mixed martial artists
Living people
Place of birth missing (living people)
Year of birth missing (living people)